The Minister for Foreign Affairs (commonly known as the Foreign Minister) is a cabinet minister responsible for foreign relations and diplomacy of Fiji, and oversees its Ministry of Foreign Affairs and International Cooperation. Especially since two military coups in 1987 harmed Fiji's relationship with other countries, with two more coups in 2000 and 2006 respectively, the Foreign Minister's position has been a very important one.

Description of the office
Like other ministers, the Foreign Minister is formally appointed by the President on the nomination of the Prime Minister, and is responsible to both the Prime Minister and the Parliament. The position may be held independently, or in conjunction with other ministerial responsibilities. From time to time, the Prime Minister has simultaneously served as Foreign Minister.

Along with all ministers, the Foreign Minister is constitutionally required to be a member of the Parliament.

List of ministers
Political parties

Other factions

Symbols

The following is a list of foreign ministers of Fiji since the country gained independence in 1970:

Notes

References

Foreign Ministers of Fiji
Foreign Ministers
Foreign Ministers